MTV2 may refer to:

 MTV2, an American television channel launched in 1996
 MTV2 (Canada), a Canadian television channel launched in 2008
 MTV2 Pop, a German channel replaced by Nickelodeon Germany
 MTV Rocks (British and Irish TV channel), previously MTV2 Europe, launched in 2010